Cigliano is a comune (municipality) in the Province of Vercelli in the Italian region Piedmont, located about  northeast of Turin and about  west of Vercelli.

Notable people 
Pietro Bollea sr., the paternal grandfather of the famous wrestler Hulk Hogan, came from Cigliano.

References

External links
 Official website